Reborn Rich is a 2022 South Korean television series adapted from the original web novel of the same name, starring Song Joong-ki, Lee Sung-min, and Shin Hyun-been. It aired on JTBC from November 18 to December 25, 2022, every Friday to Sunday at 22:30 (KST). It is also available for streaming on TVING, Netflix and Disney+ in South Korea, and on Viu and Viki in selected territories.

Reborn Rich received audience acclaim, with its final episode recording 26.9% nationwide ratings, the second highest-rated drama in Korean cable television history in both viewership ratings and number of viewers.

Synopsis
The series tells the story of Yoon Hyun-woo (Song Joong-ki), a loyal higher-up employee working for chaebol Soonyang Group, who was betrayed and murdered by a member of the Soonyang family to cover up a tax evasion scheme. Hyun-woo later wakes up in 1987 discovering that he has been reincarnated into the body of Jin Do-jun, youngest grandson of the Soonyang family. Using these circumstances to his advantage, he starts his revenge by plotting a hostile takeover of Soonyang Group.

Cast

Main
 Song Joong-ki as Jin Do-jun / Yoon Hyun-woo
 Kim Kang-hoon as young Jin Do-jun
 The senior manager of the Future Asset Management Department in Soonyang Group who is killed by the Soonyang family. Reborn as Jin Do-jun, Soonyang family's youngest grandson.
 Lee Sung-min as Jin Yang-chul
 The head of the family and founder of Soonyang Group.
 Shin Hyun-been as Seo Min-young
 A prosecutor at the Seoul Central District Prosecutors' Office. Member of an elite family with a long legacy in the legal profession.

Supporting

Soonyang family 
 Yoon Je-moon as Jin Young-ki 
 The eldest son of the Soonyang family.
 Kim Jung-nan as Son Jung-dae
 Jin Young-ki's wife. The daughter of a powerful money lender.
 Kim Nam-hee as Jin Seong-jun
 Moon Seong-hyun as young Jin Seong-joon  
 Jin Young-ki's son. The eldest grandchild of the Soonyang family.
 Park Ji-hyun as Mo Hyun-min
 Jin Seong-jun's wife. Director of an art gallery and the only daughter of Hyunsung Ilbo's owner.
 Jo Han-chul as Jin Dong-ki
 The second son of the Soonyang family.
 Seo Jae-hee as Yoo Ji-na
 Jin Dong-ki's wife. The daughter of a former Minister of Economy and Finance.
 Jo Hye-joo as Jin Ye-jun 
 Jin Dong-ki's daughter. The only granddaughter of the Soonyang family.
 Kim Shin-rok as Jin Hwa-young
 The third child and only daughter of the Soonyang family.
 Kim Do-hyun as Choi Chang-je
 Jin Hwa-young's husband. A prosecutor coming from a poor background.
 Kim Young-jae as Jin Yoon-ki
 Jin Do-jun's father. The third son and youngest child of the Soonyang family.
 Jung Hye-young as Lee Hae-in
 Jin Do-jun's mother. A former top actress.
 Kang Ki-doong as Jin Hyung-jun 
 Cha Sung-je as young Jin Hyung-jun 
 Jin Do-jun's older brother. The second grandson of the Soonyang family.
 Kim Hyun as Lee Pil-ok
 Jin Yang-cheol's wife.

Soonyang Group
 Jung Hee-tae as Lee Hang-jae 
 Jin Yang-cheol's right-hand man.
 Heo Jung-do as Kim Ju-ryeon 
 Jin Young-ki's secretary.

People around Jin Do-jun
 Park Hyuk-kwon as Oh Se-hyeon/Mason Oh
 Jin Do-jun's business partner.
 Tiffany Young as Rachel
 An analyst working with Oh Se-hyeon.
 Park Ji-hoon as Ha In-seok  
 Jin Do-jun's driver.
 Kim Jung-woo as Woo Byung-jun 
 A Soonyang employee who later works for Jin Do-jun.

Extended
 Kang Gil-woo as Baek Dong-min
 Jin Dong-ki's loyal strategist.
Lee Byung-joon as Ju Young-il 
 Chairman of Daeyoung Group.
 Lee Hwang-eui as Mo Young-bae
 Mo Hyun-min's father. The owner of Hyunsung Ilbo.
 Ham Tae-in as Soonyang Group's employee

Special appearance
Park Jin-young as Shin Gyeong-min
 An assistant manager and Yoon Hyun-woo's junior.
 Cha Sun-woo as Yoon Hyun-min
 Yoon Hyun-woo's younger brother.
 Seo Jeong-yeon as Han Kyung-hee
 Yoon Hyun-woo's mother.
 Lee Gyu-hee as Yoon Dong-su
Yoon Hyun-woo's father.

Original soundtrack

Part 1

Part 2

Part 3

Part 4

Part 5

Part 6

Part 7

Viewership

References

External links
  
 
 
 
 
 
 

2020s time travel television series
2020s workplace drama television series
2022 South Korean television series debuts
JTBC television dramas
South Korean pre-produced television series
Korean-language television shows
South Korean fantasy television series
South Korean time travel television series
South Korean workplace television series
Television shows based on South Korean webtoons
Television series by JTBC Studios
Television series by RaemongRaein
Television series produced in Seoul
Television shows set in Seoul
Television series set in the 2020s
Television series set in 1987
2022 South Korean television series endings 
Television series about revenge
Television shows about reincarnation